The Son of the Red Corsair (original title: Il figlio del corsaro rosso) is an exotic adventure novel written by Italian author Emilio Salgari, published in 1908. The novel was adapted for the silver screen in Italy in 1959.

Plot summary

The Son of the Red Corsair is a mixture of adventure, humor, and romance. Part of the series usually referred to as Pirati delle Antille, it is the story of Enrico di Ventimiglia, the Son of the Red Corsair, as he travels through the Spanish conquests of Central America in search of the stepsister he has never met. In his adventure, the Count is helped by the faithful Mendoza, the incomparable Don Barrejo, Buttafuoco, a nobleman-turned-buccaneer, and bands of pirates of the Caribbean.

Film adaptations
The first version was a silent film The Son of the Red Corsair in 1921. In 1943 a sound adaptation The Son of the Red Corsair followed by The Son of the Red Corsair (1959) was directed by Primo Zeglio and starred Lex Barker as Enrico and Sylvia Lopez as Carmen. The English-language version of the film, was released in the UK in 1962, in the US (where it was also known as The Son of the Red Pirate) in 1963.

See also
The Black Corsair
The Queen of the Caribbean
Sandokan series
The Mystery of the Black Jungle
The Tigers of Mompracem
The Pirates of Malaysia
The Two Tigers
The King of the Sea
Quest for a Throne

External links
Read reviews on Goodreads.
Il figlio del corsaro rosso at the IMDB

1908 novels
Novels by Emilio Salgari